No Time for Love is the first release on Truskill Records by Eighteen Visions.

Vinyl releases were as follows:
 5 Test Press
 100 Black/Yellow Swirl
 100 Translucent Yellow
 1795 Black
Each had a gold sticker representing its press number (2000 in total).

Track listing
 "Diana Gone Wrong" (3:46)
 "Russian Roulette with a Trigger Happy Manic Depressive" (2:55)
 "Isola in the Rain" (1:39)

Eighteen Visions albums
1999 EPs
Trustkill Records EPs